Markosia is a British comic book publishing company.

History
Markosia was founded by Harry Markos in 2004. He employed Richard Emms (previously of APC) as the Editor-in-chief as well as lead designer. in 2005. Markosia had already published Harry Gallan's The Lexian Chronicles novel and the initial plan was to produce comic adaptations of novels, such as The Lexian Chronicles and G.P. Taylor's Shadowmancer. They subsequently secured the license to adapt Starship Troopers, leading to a broadening in the business plan. This would further expand when Markosia brought Chuck Satterlee on board as Director of Operations.

Satterlee moved over from Speakeasy Comics after their troubles in 2006 and he assisted in bringing over a number of titles with him, giving Markosia a range of original comic titles. These included The Hunger by creators Jose Torres and Chris Dibari  and Chimaera Studios's with their 8 titles.

In 2007 Markosia re-branded themselves for the comics Direct Market by merging with AAM (Associated Arts and Media) to form AAM Markosia.

In 2008  the company signed a number of properties such as The Boy Who Made Silence, Ritual, N-Guard, Serpent Wars and Eagle Award nominated anthology title Eleventh Hour.

Publications

Their titles include:

Abiding Perdition (by Nick Schley and Pedro Delgado)
Alpha Gods:
Alpha Gods: Emergence (by Ian Sharman and Ezequiel Pineda)
Alpha Gods: Betrayal (by Ian Sharman and Ezequiel Pineda)
Alpha Gods: Revelation (by Ian Sharman and JJ Alonso)
Alpha Gods: Omnibus (by Ian Sharman, Ezequiel Pineda and JJ Alonso)
Beowulf (by Steve Stern and Chris Steininger)
 The Boy Who Made Silence (by Joshua Hagler) 
Breathe (by John Sheridan and Kit Wallis)
Brodie's law (by Alan Grant, David Bircham and Daley Osiyemi, issue 7 onwards and a trade paperback, August 2006. )
Brothers - The Fall of Lucifer (by Tony Lee and Wendy Alec/Sam Hart)
Dark Mists (by Annika Eade and Lee Garbett, Markosia, 2005-)
Dryland Book One (2016) by Con Chrisoulis 
Done to Death (by Andrew Foley and Fiona Staples, 5-issue miniseries, 2006)
Eleventh Hour (anthology edited by Ian Sharman)
The Hand of Glory (by Mark Bertolini and numerous artists), pulp anthology
Hero: 9 to 5:
Hero: 9 to 5 (by Ian Sharman and David Gray)
Hero: 9 to 5 - Quietus (by Ian Sharman and David Gray)
Hero: 9 to 5 - Disposable Heroes (by Ian Sharman and David Gray)
Hypergirl (by Ian Sharman and David Wynne)
The Intergalactic Adventures Of Zakk Ridley (by Ian Sharman, Pete Rogers and Ewan McLaughlin)
Kate and William: A Very Public Love Story (written by Rich Johnston, 60 pages, April 2011) collects:
William Windsor: A Very Public Prince (with art by Gary Erskine, 36 pages, April 2011)
Kate Middleton: A Very Private Princess (with art by Mike Collins, 36 pages, April 2011)
Knowledge (by Mark Bertolini, Jerome Eyquem)
Kong: King of Skull Island (by Joe DeVito, Andy Briggs, Chuck Satterlee, Dan O'Connor and Scott Larson)
The Lady & The Lost World (by Ian Sharman, Hakan Aydın and Loles Romero)
The Lexian Chronicles (by Harry Gallan with art by Inaki Miranda and Ryan Stegman)
Long Gone (by Mark Bertolini, Ted Pogo, OGN)
Midnight Kiss (by Tony Lee and Ryan Stegman/Kieran Oats, 5-issue mini-series)
Mutation (by  George T. Singley and  Ethen Beavers)
N-Guard (by Jon Bryans and Philip Jackson)
Of Bitter Souls (by Chuck Satterlee and Norm Breyfogle)
Project Eon (by Brett Thompson, Freddie Williams II and Shawn McGuan)
Return Of The Son Of Eleventh Hour (anthology edited by Ian Sharman)
Reya (by Morag and Sergei Lewis)
Ritual (by Andy Briggs and Shawn McCauley)
Scatterbrain by Brendan Deneen and Szymon Kudranski
Serpent Wars (by Christian Rodríguez, Chris Campanozzi and Antonio Rojo)
Shadowmancer (by Tony Lee and G.P. Taylor/Pedro Delgado, 10-issue adaptation)
Silent Ghost (by  George T. Singley, Thien Do and Brett Weldele)
Smoke & Mirror (by Chuck Satterlee)
Starship Troopers:
Blaze of Glory (by Tony Lee and Sam Hart, previously published through Mongoose Publishing)
Dead Man's Hand (by Tony Lee and Neil Edwards)
Damaged Justice (by Tony Lee and Shanth Enjeti)
Starship Troopers: Ongoing Series  #1-4 Marooned (by Tony Lee and Chris DiBari)
Starship Troopers: Ongoing Series  #5-8 Bad Blood (by Cy Dethan and Paul Green)
Starship Troopers: Ongoing Series  #9-10 Triple Threat (by Cy Dethan, Tony Lee, Christian Beranek - stories and Scott James, Jim Boswell, Neil Edwards - art)
Starship Troopers: Ongoing Series  #11-14 Fool's Errand (by Cy Dethan and Diego Simone)
Starship Troopers: Ongoing Series War Stories - Vandals One Shots (by Cy Dethan and Various)
The Tizzle Sisters (by Tony Lee and G.P. Taylor, Dan Boultwood, graphic novel/prose hybrid, October 2006)
The Flying Friar (by Rich Johnston and Thomas Nachlik)
The Hill (by Sal Cipriano and Jok)
Hope Falls (by Tony Lee and Dan Boultwood, 5-issue mini-series)
Jazan Wild's Carnival of Souls (by Jazan Wild, Stefan Petrucha, and Kevin Conrad)
Haven (by Leonardo Ramirez, ongoing series)
Serpent Wars (by Christian Rodriguez and Chris Campanozzi/Antonio Rojo, graphic novel)
The Dark (by Chris Lynch and Rick Lundeen, 4-issue mini-series)
Cancertown: An Inconvenient Tooth (by Cy Dethan and Stephen Downey, 6-issue mini-series)
The Indifference Engine: A Holographic Novel (by Cy Dethan and Rob Carey, 4-issue mini-series)
Slaughterman's Creed (by Cy Dethan and Stephen Downey, 5-issue mini-series)
Bayou Arcana (by Various Male Writers and Various Female Artists, graphic anthology)
Urban Legends (by Steven Stone and various artists, graphic novel anthology)
Voyaga (by Brandon Barrows, Ionic and Rudolf Montemayor, graphic novel. . October 2012)
Dark Lies, Darker Truths (by Dino Caruso and Sami Kivelä, graphic novel. . October 2012)
Words On A Wall (by Ian Sharman)

Notes

References

Markosia at the International Catalogue of Superheroes

External links

Profile, Comics Bulletin

Comic book publishing companies of the United Kingdom
2005 establishments in the United Kingdom
Companies established in 2005